Agassiz station may refer to:

Agassiz station (British Columbia), a Canadian railway station
George R. Agassiz Station, an American observatory